Maerua andradae is a species of plant in the Capparaceae family. It is endemic to Mozambique.

References

andradae
Endemic flora of Mozambique
Taxonomy articles created by Polbot